LPLA may refer to:
 Lajes Field
 Lipoate—protein ligase, an enzyme